The  Miss Iowa Teen USA competition is the pageant that selects the representative for the state of Iowa in the Miss Teen USA pageant, which is co-owned by the Miss USA Organization by Crystle Stewart. This pageant is produced by Future Productions, LLC which also produces state pageants for Minnesota, Wisconsin, North Dakota, Colorado, South Dakota, and Wyoming.

Miss Iowa Teen USA 1992 Jamie Solinger was crowned Miss Teen USA at the national pageant held in Biloxi, Mississippi that year. Iowa became the 9th state that won the Miss Teen USA title for the first time.

Solinger is one of only three Iowa teens to cross over and win the Miss Iowa USA title.

Marisa Mathson of Waukee was crowned Miss Iowa Teen USA 2022 on May 21, 2022, at Des Moines Marriott Downtown in Des Moines. She will represent Iowa for the title of Miss Teen USA 2022.

Results summary

Placements
Winner: Jamie Solinger (1992)
Top 12: Chelsey Ridge (1995)
Top 15/16: Alyssa Cook (2003), Carley Arnold (2017), Angel Strong (2021), Marisa Mathson (2022)
Iowa holds a record of 6 placements at Miss Teen USA.

Special Award
Miss Photogenic: Allyson Hovda (2009)

Winners 

1 Age at the time of the Miss Teen USA pageant

External links
Official website

References

Iowa
Women in Iowa